Charles Herbert Hunter (18 April 1867 – 2 April 1955) was an English cricketer. He played in three first-class cricket matches between 1889 and 1895. He was born in Lee in London in 1867, the son of a wealthy timber merchant.

Hunter was educated at Uppingham School where he played cricket as a wicket-keeper for the school XI. He went up to Cambridge University and played one first-class match for Cambridge University Cricket Club in 1889, suffering somewhat by Gregor MacGregor being a contemporary at both Uppingham and Cambridge. He played club cricket Bickley Park Cricket Club and in 1894 played twice for the Kent County Cricket Club Second XI before making two first-class appearances for the side in 1895. He continued to play club cricket for a variety of sides into the 1900s.

After marrying Euphemia Parke at Quebec City in Canada in 1899, Hunter worked first as a solicitor's clerk before taking over the family timber business. The couple had one son. After retiring to live in Devon, he died at Budleigh Salterton in April 1955 aged 87.

References

External links

1867 births
1955 deaths
English cricketers
Kent cricketers
Cambridge University cricketers